Zaorejas is a municipality located in the province of Guadalajara, Castile-La Mancha, Spain. According to the 2004 census (INE), the municipality had a population of 197 inhabitants.

There are remains of a Roman aqueduct in the village.

Two other settlements, Huertapelayo and Villar de Cobeta, are part of the municipality.

References

Municipalities in the Province of Guadalajara